A Bibliography of books about African women. Entries are ordered by author alphabetically:

A

B

C

E

F

G

H

J

L

M

N

O

P

R

S

T

U

V

W

See also
Bibliography of Nigerian women

African studies
Books about Africa
Books about women
Women in Africa
Lists of books